The Brown's Farm area is a neighborhood located within the  Philippi area of Cape Town's Cape Flats region, in the Western Cape province of South Africa. The urban area is densely populated and contains many informal homes. The 2011 national census recorded 71,518 residents living in the area.

History
The community was first planned out in 1986 by the Apartheid government which saw the establishment of Villages 2B, 3 and 4 with village 4A being added later. It initially had an urban density of 25 housing units per hectare. In 1994 area 4A was rapidly settled over the cause of a weekend as informal structures were erected on 500 sites during a land invasion. The area's population grew rapidly in the mid-1990s following the 1994 election.

References 

Townships in the Western Cape
Suburbs of Cape Town